My Skinny Sister is a 2015 Swedish drama film directed by Sanna Lenken. The film stars Rebecka Josephson and Amy Deasismont. Lenken was anorexic as a teenager, and previously made a short film also about eating disorders.

Plot
As Stella enters what she hopes will be the exciting world of adolescence, she discovers that her big sister and role model, Katja, is hiding an eating disorder. The disease slowly tears the family apart.

Cast
Rebecka Josephson as Stella
Amy Deasismont as Katja
Henrik Norlén as Lasse
Annika Hallin as Karin
Maxim Mehmet as Jacob

Critical reception
Variety wrote of the film, "[..] Sanna Lenken brings some humor and charm to a difficult issue before ultimately spiraling into moralistic Afterschool Special territory".

The film won the Crystal Bear at the 2015 Berlin International Film Festival and the Audience Award at the Gothenburg Film Festival.

See also
Thin Blue Line (Swedish TV series), partly directed by Sanna Lenken

References

External links
 

2015 films
Swedish drama films
Films about eating disorders
2010s Swedish films